Garth (Mid Glamorgan) railway station is a railway station serving the village of Garth, Bridgend, Wales. It is located on the Maesteg Line from Cardiff via Bridgend.

History
It replaced a previous station, south of the current location, which was known as 'Troedyrhiw Garth', which closed in 1970. When the current station opened with the restoration of passenger services in 1992 by British Rail, there was much local debate whether to call the station 'Troedyrhiw Garth' once more because of the potential confusion with Garth Railway Station on the Heart of Wales Line in Powys. Upon opening on 28 September 1992 the new station was named simply Garth.

Service
Passenger services are operated by Transport for Wales as part of the Valley Lines commuter rail network.

References

External links

Maesteg
Railway stations in Bridgend County Borough
DfT Category F2 stations
Railway stations opened by British Rail
Railway stations in Great Britain opened in 1992
Railway stations served by Transport for Wales Rail